In the 1955–56 season, USM Alger competed in the Second Division for the 19th season French colonial era, as well as the Forconi Cup. They competed in Second Division, and the Forconi Cup. In 1956, the central management of the National Liberation Front (FLN) decided to cease all sporting activities of Muslim clubs. A meeting was held at the USMA circle on Rue de Bône to decide on the cessation of football. In 1955–56 Second Division, the last season before the independence of Algeria, where on March 4, 1956 in the 16th round against AS Rivet and two games before the end of the season USM Alger withdrew from the tournament, the League of Algiers office registered the packages of many Muslim clubs following the events that occurred at the match between the MC Alger and AS Saint Eugène. In Promotion Honneur, RC Kouba, USM Marengo, WR Belcourt, JS Kabylie, JS El Biar and OM Saint Eugène declared general forfeiture on 11 March 1956.

Competitions

Overview

Second Division

League table

Group III

Matches

Forconi Cup

Squad information

Playing statistics

Goalscorers
Includes all competitive matches. The list is sorted alphabetically by surname when total goals are equal.

References

USM Alger seasons
Algerian football clubs 1955–56 season